The BMW R 11 was the first touring motorcycle in the 750cc class manufactured by the German Motorcycle with a pressed-steel frame in duplex form, in the vein of the Neander motorcycle of Ernst Neumann-Neander.

7,500 R 11 motorcycles were produced between 1930 and 1934.

History
In 1928, BMW presented with the R 11 and R 16, the first motorcycles with a pressed steel frame. In BMW's price lists No. 37 and No. 38 from January and February 1929, the motorcycles were announced for early 1930. The motorcycles were no longer listed in March 1929's price list No. 39. Delivery of the motorcycles first began in Germany in the summer of 1930.

Mechanics

Engine
Its M 56 engine was a four-stroke two-cylinder valve-in-block boxer engine.

Cylinder
The gray iron cylinder had removable aluminium cylinder heads and radial cooling fins.

Transmission
The R 11 had a manual transmission with a driveshaft on the right side of the unsprung rear wheel.

The kickstarter was operated at a right angle to the vehicle's longitudinal axis.

References

BMW motorcycles
Touring motorcycles